FC Oneşti Stadium is a multi-use stadium in Oneşti. It was the home ground of the defunct FC Oneşti. It holds 12,000 people.

Football venues in Romania